Hans-Peter Stenzl was born in 1960. He and his brother Volker form the leading German piano duet of the younger generation, called Stenzl Pianoduo.

Since the profit of the Munich German national radio and television network contest in 1986 the Stenzls have appeared in almost all countries of Europe, in West Africa, in North America and South America, and also in Japan.

In September, 1999 they had their debut in the Suntory Resound in Tokyo. In the meantime Hans-Peter Stenzl is also an "in-demand" juror at national and international music contests.

References

External links 
Stenzl Pianoduo website

German classical pianists
Male classical pianists
German music educators
1960 births
Living people
21st-century classical pianists
21st-century male musicians